Go On... is the third album by American pop rock band Mr. Mister, released on September 8, 1987, by RCA Records. It features a more serious tone than their previous album Welcome to the Real World, which was commercially successful. This album did not fare as well commercially and would become the last publicly released album by the band before they broke up in 1990.

Reception

In their retrospective review, AllMusic contended that Go On... retained the same themes, stylistics, and quality of work as their previous releases, and "The only significant change was in record sales." They particularly praised the album's lyrics, commenting, "during the height of the materialistic '80s, Go On was an example of a band using its pop culture bully pulpit to suggest that the "greed is good" philosophy was leaving a spiritual vacuum in American culture."

Track listing

CD
All songs by Richard Page, Steve George and John Lang except where noted:

"Stand and Deliver" – 5:33
"Healing Waters" – 5:07 (Page, George, Lang, Farris, Mastelotto) *Mistakenly printed as 5:45 on physical disc (CD)
"Dust" – 6:35
"Something Real (Inside Me/Inside You)" – 4:24
"The Tube" – 5:23
"Bare My Soul" * – 4:32 (Page, George, Lang)
"Control" – 4:20
"Watching the World" – 4:25
"Power Over Me" – 5:04
"Man of a Thousand Dances" – 4:51 (Page, George, Lang, Farris)
"The Border" – 5:42

LP/Cassette
Side one
"Stand and Deliver" – 5:33
"Healing Waters" – 5:07 (mistaken as 5:45 on CD)
"Dust" – 6:35
"Something Real (Inside Me/Inside You)" – 4:24
"The Tube" – 5:23

Side two
"Control" – 4:20
"Watching the World" – 4:25
"Power Over Me" – 5:04
"Man of a Thousand Dances" – 4:51
"The Border" – 5:42

 * Track only available on CD and "Something Real" vinyl single.

Personnel 
Mr. Mister
 Richard Page – bass, vocals
 Steve George – keyboards, Synclavier, soprano saxophone, vocals
 Steve Farris – guitars
 Pat Mastelotto – drums

Additional personnel
 John Lang – lyrics
 Alex Acuña – percussion
 Lenny Castro – percussion
 Alan Estes – percussion
 Bill Champlin – backing vocals
 Tamara Champlin – backing vocals
 Phil Perry – backing vocals
 Stan Lee Revue – backing vocals
 Carmen Twillie – backing vocals

Production 
 Kevin Killen – producer, engineer, mixing
 Jimmy Hoyson – second engineer
 Bob Ludwig – mastering at Masterdisk (New York City)
 Jonathan Owen MA (RCA) –  cover illustration
 Ria Lewerke – art direction
 Norman Moore – art direction, design
 Tracy Veal – design
 Reed Anderson – liner photography
 Georg Kushner – sleeve photography
 Susan Gilman – production coordinator
 Sherry Rettig – production coordinator

Charts

Certifications

References

1987 albums
Mr. Mister albums
RCA Records albums